Past-Time Rail ran railtours for over 40 years but in June 2009 they went bankrupt and they sold all of their tours to a company called Pathfinder Tours.

References

Railtour operators of the United Kingdom